Club Deportivo Utiel is a football team based in Utiel in the autonomous community of Valencian Community. Founded in 1945, the team plays in Tercera División – Group 6. The club's home ground is La Celadilla, which has a capacity of 1,500 spectators.

Season to season

9 seasons in Tercera División

External links
Official website
Futbolme.com profile

Football clubs in the Valencian Community
Association football clubs established in 1945
1945 establishments in Spain